Apollo KH Hospital is a multi speciality hospital located at Melvisharam in the city of Vellore, Tamil Nadu. This hospital is a product of joint venture between Apollo Hospitals, Chennai and KH Group, Melvisharam, Vellore who perceived the need of a hospital in this region.

About
Apollo KH Hospital started functioning from 14 September 2003.

Services
Apollo KH has following facilities:
 24 hours Emergency Care
 24 hours Diagnostic Services
 Critical Care Units
 Emergency & Trauma Care
 Intensive Care Units
 Master Health Check Up
 Telemedicine

References 

Hospital buildings completed in 2003
Hospitals in Vellore
2003 establishments in Tamil Nadu
Hospitals established in 2003